The Men's 200 metre butterfly competition of the 2016 European Aquatics Championships was held on 18-19 May 2016.

Records
Prior to the competition, the existing world, European and championship records were as follows.

Results

Heats
The heats were held on 18 May at 10:00.

Semifinals
The semifinals were held on 18 May at 19:03.

Semifinal 1

Semifinal 2

Final
The final was held on 19 May at 19:06.

References

Men's 200 metre butterfly